Petrucci may refer to

 Petrucci family, a royal Renaissance family from Italy
 Petrucci (surname)

See also
 Petrucci Music Library
 Petruccio (disambiguation)